Nizhny Iskush (Tübänge İsquş) is a rural locality (a selo) and the administrative centre of Nizhneiskushinsky Selsoviet, Belokataysky District, Bashkortostan, Russia. The population was 394 as of 2010. There are 5 streets.

Geography 
Nizhny Iskush is located 27 km northwest of Novobelokatay (the district's administrative centre) by road. Verkhny Iskush is the nearest rural locality.

References 

Rural localities in Belokataysky District